Fort Zumwalt School District is headquartered in O'Fallon, Missouri, United States.

The largest school district in St. Charles County, the district serves the cities of O'Fallon, Saint Peters, Dardenne Prairie, Saint Paul, and portions of Wentzville.

Schools

High schools

 Comprehensive
 Fort Zumwalt East High School (Saint Peters)
 Fort Zumwalt North High School (O'Fallon)
 Fort Zumwalt South High School (Saint Peters)
 Fort Zumwalt West High School (O'Fallon)

 Alternative
 Fort Zumwalt Hope High School (O'Fallon)

Middle schools

Elementary schools

Education centers
 Fort Zumwalt Early Childhood Center (Saint Peters)
 Mike Clemens Center for Adaptive Learning (O'Fallon)

References

External links
 Fort Zumwalt School District

School districts in Missouri
Education in St. Charles County, Missouri
1949 establishments in Missouri
School districts established in 1949